Morais is a Portuguese parish located in the municipality of Macedo de Cavaleiros (Bragança District). The population in 2011 was 644, in an area of 52.16 km².

See also

References

Freguesias of Macedo de Cavaleiros